Fazlur Rahman Sultan is a Bangladesh Nationalist Party politician and the former Member of Parliament of Mymensingh-11.

Career
Sultan was elected to parliament from Mymensingh-11 as a Bangladesh Nationalist Party candidate in 1979.

References

Bangladesh Nationalist Party politicians
Living people
2nd Jatiya Sangsad members
People from Mymensingh District
6th Jatiya Sangsad members
Year of birth missing (living people)